Marci Ien  (born July 29, 1969) is a Canadian politician serving as the minister for women and gender equality and youth since October 26, 2021. A member of the Liberal Party, Ien represents Toronto Centre in the House of Commons. Previously, she was a broadcast journalist for CTV. She co-hosted  the CTV daytime talk show The Social from 2017 until 2020. Previously, she was a reporter for CTV News and a co-anchor on the CTV morning program Canada AM. As a child she appeared regularly on the Christian children's show Circle Square.

Background
Marci Ien is a Black Canadian of Trinidadian descent. Her father, Joel Ien, had come to Canada in the late 1960s to attend university and went on to a career in education as a teacher, principal, and school superintendent in Toronto. Ien was born in Toronto's St. James Town neighbourhood and grew up in Scarborough, going on to attend Stephen Leacock Collegiate Institute and Agincourt Collegiate Institute. Ien appeared regularly on the Crossroads Christian Communications program Circle Square.

Ien lives in Toronto with her two children, Blaize and Dash. Her 2020 book Off Script: Living Out Loud chronicles her life growing up in Toronto, working as a journalist, and deciding to enter politics.

Journalism
Ien graduated with a degree in radio and television arts from Ryerson Polytechnical Institute in 1991. She began her career at CHCH-TV in Hamilton, Ontario in 1991 as a news writer and general assignment reporter. In 1995 she began reporting from Queen's Park in Toronto, with her reports appearing both on CHCH's local news and on WIC's national newscast Canada Tonight.

In 1997 Ien moved to CTV as a reporter for CTV Atlantic, covering major stories including the crash of Swissair Flight 111 off Peggy's Cove, Nova Scotia, before returning to Toronto in 1998 to anchor CTV Newsnet, as CTV's all-news channel was then called,. From 2003, Ien also anchored the nationwide Canada AM morning broadcast show, which she co-hosted from 2011 until the show's cancellation in 2016. Ien returned to Atlantic Canada to participate in the Halifax leg of the 2010 Winter Olympics torch relay.

Following Canada AM, Ien was a guest and then permanent host of The Social (2016-2020) until her move to politics.

Awards
In 1995, Ien won a Radio Television Digital News Association Award for her news serial Journey to Freedom, a look at the Underground Railroad. In 2008, she was the recipient of a Black Business and Professional Association Harry Jerome Award in the media category. In 2014, she was granted the Planet Africa Award for excellence in media. In 2015, Ien garnered a Canadian Screen Award nomination in the Best Host category for her work on Canada AM. In 2016, she was honoured with an African Canadian Achievement Award for her journalistic achievements.

Politics
On September 17, 2020, Ien was announced as the Liberal Party of Canada's candidate in Toronto Centre for a by-election to fill the seat vacated by former Finance minister Bill Morneau's resignation. She won the by-election on October 26, 2020, defeating Green Party of Canada leader Annamie Paul.

Ien was re-elected on September 20, 2021 with increased support, and appointed to Cabinet as Minister for Women, Gender Equality and Youth on October 26, 2021.

Electoral record

References

External links

1969 births
Living people
Actresses from Toronto
Black Canadian broadcasters
Canadian child actresses
Canadian people of Trinidad and Tobago descent
Canadian television news anchors
Journalists from Toronto
People from Old Toronto
Politicians from Toronto
Toronto Metropolitan University alumni
Canadian women television journalists
Black Canadian women
CTV Television Network people
Canadian television talk show hosts
Liberal Party of Canada MPs
Members of the 29th Canadian Ministry
Members of the House of Commons of Canada from Ontario
Members of the King's Privy Council for Canada
Black Canadian politicians
Women government ministers of Canada
Women members of the House of Commons of Canada
20th-century Canadian journalists
21st-century Canadian journalists
21st-century Canadian women politicians
20th-century Canadian actresses